Bangla Bazar is the oldest neighbourhood of Dhaka, which existed before Mughal Period. Currently, the largest publication and book market of Dhaka is located in the area.

History
Some historians think that Bangla Bazar was the center of the 'Bangala' city mentioned by many travelers. Some others think that Bangla Bazar was established in Sultani period when the word 'Bangala' became popular.

References

Bazaars in Bangladesh
Economy of Dhaka
Neighbourhoods in Dhaka
Populated places in Dhaka Division
History of Dhaka